Březová is a town in Sokolov District in the Karlovy Vary Region of the Czech Republic. It has about 2,600 inhabitants.

Administrative parts
Villages of Arnoltov, Kamenice, Kostelní Bříza, Lobzy, Rudolec and Tisová are administrative parts of Březová.

Twin towns – sister cities

Březová is twinned with:
 Pausa-Mühltroff, Germany

References

External links

Cities and towns in the Czech Republic
Populated places in Sokolov District